Josep Oms Pallise (born 20 July 1973) is a Catalonia born Spanish chess player who holds the title of Grandmaster (GM) (2007) and from 2003 till 2007 played for Andorra. He is four-times Andorran Chess Championship winner (2003–2006) and Chess Olympiad individual gold medal winner (2006).

Biography
In 1993, Josep Oms Pallise won Spanish Junior Chess Championship and played for Spain in European Junior Chess Championship. In 2000, he shared 2nd place in Catalonia Chess Championship. Josep Oms Pallise four time in row won Andorran Chess Championship (2003-2006). In 2004, he shared 3rd place in Spanish Chess Championship. Josep Oms Pallise is winner of many international chess tournament, include Valencia (1996), Zaragoza (1998, 1999), Seville (2000), Barcelona (2008).

Josep Oms Pallise played for Andorra in the Chess Olympiads:
 In 2004, at second board in the 36th Chess Olympiad in Calvià (+6, =2, -4),
 In 2006, at second board in the 37th Chess Olympiad in Turin (+7, =4, -0) and won individual gold medal. 

In 1997, he was awarded the FIDE International Master (IM) title and received the FIDE Grandmaster (GM) title ten years later. Also he is FIDE Trainer (2014).

References

External links

Josep Oms Pallise chess games at 365chess.com

1973 births
Living people
Sportspeople from Lleida
Andorran chess players
Spanish chess players
Chess Olympiad competitors
Chess grandmasters